Martina Hingis and Sania Mirza were the defending champions, but Hingis chose not to participate this year. Mirza played alongside Bethanie Mattek-Sands and successfully defended her title, defeating Ekaterina Makarova and Elena Vesnina in the final, 6–2, 6–3.

Seeds

Draw

References 
Main Draw

Brisbane International Doubles
Women's Doubles